Richard Reginald Schell (July 6, 1941 – May 9, 2012), better known as Captain Reggie Schell, was a political activist who was a member of the Philadelphia chapter of the Black Panther Party from early 1969 to late 1970. He then founded a Philadelphia grassroots organization called the Black United Liberation Front in which he was the chairman from 1970 to 1978.

References

1941 births
2012 deaths
Members of the Black Panther Party